Eamon Doherty (born 4 January 1974) is a retired Irish League footballer who most recently played for Crusaders.

Biography
'Doc' started his career at Coleraine, before signing for Derry City and becoming a stalwart of their midfield for many years. He then had spell at Limavady United before joining current club Crusaders. He retired at the end of the 2009/10 season, but came out of retirement to re-sign for the Crues after a player shortage. He made his 2nd debut on 25 September 2010, coming on as a substitute away to Portadown, but was forced to retire one month later, due to work commitments. He made 113 appearances for the Crues, scoring 7 goals.

Honours
Derry City
FAI Cup (1): 2002
League of Ireland Cup (2): 1999/2000, 2005

Crusaders
Irish Cup (1): 2008/09
County Antrim Shield (1): 2009/10

References 

Association footballers from Northern Ireland
Coleraine F.C. players
Crusaders F.C. players
Derry City F.C. players
Limavady United F.C. players
Living people
1974 births
Association football midfielders